The 1st constituency of the Ardennes is a French legislative constituency in the Ardennes département. It is currently represented by Lionel Vuibert
of Agir.

Description

It is located in the south-west third of the Department, and cuts the town of Charleville-Mézières in two.

Deputies

Election results

2022

 
 
 
 
 
 
 
 
|-
| colspan="8" bgcolor="#E9E9E9"|
|-
 
 

 
 
 
 
 

* Dissident LREM candidate, not supported by Ensemble.

2017

2012

|- style="background-color:#E9E9E9;text-align:center;"
! colspan="2" rowspan="2" style="text-align:left;" | Candidate
! rowspan="2" colspan="2" style="text-align:left;" | Party
! colspan="2" | 1st round
! colspan="2" | 2nd round
|- style="background-color:#E9E9E9;text-align:center;"
! width="75" | Votes
! width="30" | %
! width="75" | Votes
! width="30" | %
|-
| style="background-color:" |
| style="text-align:left;" | Bérengère Poletti
| style="text-align:left;" | Union for a Popular Movement
| UMP
| 
| 39.56%
| 
| 55.30%
|-
| style="background-color:" |
| style="text-align:left;" | Claudine Ledoux
| style="text-align:left;" | Socialist Party
| PS
| 
| 33.83%
| 
| 44.70%
|-
| style="background-color:" |
| style="text-align:left;" | Anne-Sophie Leclere
| style="text-align:left;" | National Front
| FN
| 
| 16.76%
| colspan="2" style="text-align:left;" |
|-
| style="background-color:" |
| style="text-align:left;" | Sylvain Dalla Rosa
| style="text-align:left;" | Left Front
| FG
| 
| 4.77%
| colspan="2" style="text-align:left;" |
|-
| style="background-color:" |
| style="text-align:left;" | Christophe Dumont
| style="text-align:left;" | The Greens
| VEC
| 
| 1.89%
| colspan="2" style="text-align:left;" |
|-
| style="background-color:" |
| style="text-align:left;" | Virginie Lauby Heber-Suffrin
| style="text-align:left;" | 
| CEN
| 
| 1.85%
| colspan="2" style="text-align:left;" |
|-
| style="background-color:" |
| style="text-align:left;" | Joël Nouet
| style="text-align:left;" | Far Left
| EXG
| 
| 0.51%
| colspan="2" style="text-align:left;" |
|-
| style="background-color:" |
| style="text-align:left;" | Sylvie Goulden
| style="text-align:left;" | Ecologist
| ECO
| 
| 0.45%
| colspan="2" style="text-align:left;" |
|-
| style="background-color:" |
| style="text-align:left;" | Christiane Gey
| style="text-align:left;" | Miscellaneous Right
| DVD
| 
| 0.37%
| colspan="2" style="text-align:left;" |
|-
| colspan="8" style="background-color:#E9E9E9;"|
|- style="font-weight:bold"
| colspan="4" style="text-align:left;" | Total
| 
| 100%
| 
| 100%
|-
| colspan="8" style="background-color:#E9E9E9;"|
|-
| colspan="4" style="text-align:left;" | Registered voters
| 
| style="background-color:#E9E9E9;"|
| 
| style="background-color:#E9E9E9;"|
|-
| colspan="4" style="text-align:left;" | Blank/Void ballots
| 
| 1.18%
| 
| 3.01%
|-
| colspan="4" style="text-align:left;" | Turnout
| 
| 57.66%
| 
| 57.74%
|-
| colspan="4" style="text-align:left;" | Abstentions
| 
| 42.34%
| 
| 42.26%
|-
| colspan="8" style="background-color:#E9E9E9;"|
|- style="font-weight:bold"
| colspan="6" style="text-align:left;" | Result
| colspan="2" style="background-color:" | UMP HOLD
|}

2007

|- style="background-color:#E9E9E9;text-align:center;"
! colspan="2" rowspan="2" style="text-align:left;" | Candidate
! rowspan="2" colspan="2" style="text-align:left;" | Party
! colspan="2" | 1st round
! colspan="2" | 2nd round
|- style="background-color:#E9E9E9;text-align:center;"
! width="75" | Votes
! width="30" | %
! width="75" | Votes
! width="30" | %
|-
| style="background-color:" |
| style="text-align:left;" | Bérengère Poletti
| style="text-align:left;" | Union for a Popular Movement
| UMP
| 
| 48.93%
| 
| 59.52%
|-
| style="background-color:" |
| style="text-align:left;" | Claudine Ledoux
| style="text-align:left;" | Socialist Party
| PS
| 
| 26.89%
| 
| 40.48%
|-
| style="background-color:" |
| style="text-align:left;" | Jean-François Leclet
| style="text-align:left;" | Democratic Movement
| MoDem
| 
| 9.63%
| colspan="2" style="text-align:left;" |
|-
| style="background-color:" |
| style="text-align:left;" | Chantal Taioli
| style="text-align:left;" | National Front
| FN
| 
| 4.28%
| colspan="2" style="text-align:left;" |
|-
| style="background-color:" |
| style="text-align:left;" | Sylvain Dalla Rosa
| style="text-align:left;" | Communist
| COM
| 
| 3.28%
| colspan="2" style="text-align:left;" |
|-
| style="background-color:" |
| style="text-align:left;" | François Botte
| style="text-align:left;" | Far Left
| EXG
| 
| 2.17%
| colspan="2" style="text-align:left;" |
|-
| style="background-color:" |
| style="text-align:left;" | Philippe Lenice
| style="text-align:left;" | The Greens
| VEC
| 
| 2.06%
| colspan="2" style="text-align:left;" |
|-
| style="background-color:" |
| style="text-align:left;" | Nadia Octave
| style="text-align:left;" | Far Left
| EXG
| 
| 1.07%
| colspan="2" style="text-align:left;" |
|-
| style="background-color:" |
| style="text-align:left;" | Valérie Lenoir
| style="text-align:left;" | Movement for France
| MPF
| 
| 0.98%
| colspan="2" style="text-align:left;" |
|-
| style="background-color:" |
| style="text-align:left;" | Philippe Fesneau
| style="text-align:left;" | Far Right
| EXD
| 
| 0.71%
| colspan="2" style="text-align:left;" |
|-
| colspan="8" style="background-color:#E9E9E9;"|
|- style="font-weight:bold"
| colspan="4" style="text-align:left;" | Total
| 
| 100%
| 
| 100%
|-
| colspan="8" style="background-color:#E9E9E9;"|
|-
| colspan="4" style="text-align:left;" | Registered voters
| 
| style="background-color:#E9E9E9;"|
| 
| style="background-color:#E9E9E9;"|
|-
| colspan="4" style="text-align:left;" | Blank/Void ballots
| 
| 1.36%
| 
| 2.73%
|-
| colspan="4" style="text-align:left;" | Turnout
| 
| 59.00%
| 
| 58.32%
|-
| colspan="4" style="text-align:left;" | Abstentions
| 
| 41.00%
| 
| 41.68%
|-
| colspan="8" style="background-color:#E9E9E9;"|
|- style="font-weight:bold"
| colspan="6" style="text-align:left;" | Result
| colspan="2" style="background-color:" | UMP HOLD
|}

2002

 
 
 
 
|-
| colspan="8" bgcolor="#E9E9E9"|
|-

1997

References

 French Interior Ministry results website: 

1